Vladimir Dašić (born May 13, 1988) is a Montenegrin professional basketball player for KK Danilovgrad of the Montenegrin League. He is 6'10" (2.08 m) in height and he plays as both a small forward and a power forward.

Professional career
Dašić began his professional career in the Serbia and Montenegro League with Budućnost Podgorica in 2004. There, Dašić made a name for himself and was widely considered at the time as one of the best young players in Europe and attracted interest from many big European clubs.

On August 26, 2009, he transferred to the Spanish ACB League club Real Madrid. At Madrid, Dašić had a limited playing time and with the arrival of Ante Tomić his playing time became even more reduced so he was loaned out to Gran Canaria.

In October 2010 he signed with Lottomatica Roma of the Italian Lega Basket Serie A. In January 2012, he left Lottomatica Roma and signed with Slovenian club Union Olimpija for the rest of the 2011–12 season.

On September 4, 2012, he signed a contract with Beşiktaş. After he was released from his Beşiktaş contract, Dašić signed for KK Metalac Valjevo for the rest of the 2012–13 season.

In January 2014, he signed with Al Ahli Dubai of United Arab Emirates.

On July 3, 2014, he returned after five years to Budućnost Podgorica, signing a 1+1 contract. On April 25, he was released by Budućnost Podgorica. On January 5, 2017, Dašić signed with the Cypriot team AEK Larnaca. His goal was to prepare for the 2017 EuroBasket, but he experienced a severe injury of a ligament and consequently became a free agent in April 2018. After a year and a half of not playing professional basketball, in December 2018 he signed with Zadar of the Croatian League.

On September 20, 2019, he signed with GKK Šibenka. On December 2, 2019, he left Šibenka.

Personal life
Dašić and his girlfriend Marija welcomed their first daughter, Laura, in February 2012. He has two tattoos on his body including a cross on his back with the words which Tsar Lazar said before battle of Kosovo wrapped around it and a dedication to his deceased friend, Ljubo Jovanović who was also a basketball player, with the inscription of his name on a basketball on his left bicep.

His family originates from Berane.

Montenegrin national team
Dašić won the gold medal at the 2005 FIBA Europe Under-18 Championship while playing the Serbia and Montenegro's junior team. He then chose to play for the senior Montenegrin national team.

References

External links
 ABA League Profile
 Draftexpress.com Profile
 Euroleague.net Profile
 EuroBasket.com Profile
 FIBA Profile
 NBA.com Profile

1988 births
Living people
ABA League players
AEK Larnaca B.C. players
Basketball League of Serbia players
Beşiktaş men's basketball players
CB Gran Canaria players
KK Budućnost players
KK Metalac Valjevo players
KK Olimpija players
Liga ACB players
Montenegrin expatriate basketball people in Serbia
Montenegrin men's basketball players
Montenegrin expatriate basketball people in Spain
Pallacanestro Virtus Roma players
Power forwards (basketball)
Real Madrid Baloncesto players
Small forwards
Sportspeople from Podgorica
KK Zadar players